McGraw Tower is a clock tower located on the campus of Cornell University in Ithaca, New York. The tower was known as Library Tower when it was first built but was renamed in 1961 in honor of either John McGraw, one of Cornell's original donors, or his daughter Jennie McGraw, the philanthropist in whose honor the tower and its adjacent library were originally commissioned by Henry W. Sage. 

Although not originally intended to function as a bell tower, it has housed the Cornell Chimes, which Jennie McGraw donated to the university in 1868, since its construction finished in 1891. The Cornell Chimes were the first chimes housed and rung on an American college campus. The chimes play music three times each day during the school year. They also ring every fifteen minutes between 7:00 A.M. and 11:00 P.M.

History 
McGraw Tower was designed as part of Uris Library by William Henry Miller, and construction finished in 1891. The construction of the library and tower, then called the University Library, was funded by Henry W. Sage to be built in the memory of Jennie McGraw. Sage believed McGraw had intended to donate her estate to the construction of a library on Cornell's campus upon her death; however, this claim was contested by her husband, Cornell professor and librarian Willard Fiske. The university took Sage's view, leading to years of litigation, but eventually, the Supreme Court ruled in favor of Fiske.

On October 8, 1997, passersby noticed a pumpkin on top of the tower's spire. Who placed the pumpkin atop the tower, why they did so, and how remain unknown. Widely considered the greatest prank in the university's history, the pumpkin prompted national media coverage, the creation of a live webcam, its own daily feature in one of the school papers, and at least two scientific inquiries into whether the object on top of the tower was, in fact, a pumpkin. (Both confirmed that it was.) It also inspired a unique version of the Cornell alma mater. It was removed on March 13, 1998.

On April 11, 2022, the tower resumed allowing public attendance of its chimes concerts after a near two-year hiatus caused by the COVID-19 pandemic.

References

Cornell University
Clock towers in New York (state)
Bell towers in the United States